The Swedish Warmblood or Swedish Half-bred is a Swedish breed of warmblood horse. It was originally bred as a cavalry horse at the Strömsholm and Flyinge studs. In the twentieth century it became a general-purpose riding and sport horse. It performs well in dressage, show-jumping and three-day eventing, and also as a harness horse.

History 

The origins of the Swedish Warmblood lie in the seventeenth century, when foreign horses were imported to Sweden from various countries, mostly in Europe, and were cross-bred with mares of local stock to produce horses suitable for military use. Of these imports, Spanish and Friesian animals were the most important; others came from Denmark, England, France, the German-speaking area, Hungary, the Ottoman Empire and Russia.

In the late nineteenth and early twentieth centuries there were further imports, of sport horses of Arab, Thoroughbred, Hanoverian and particularly of Trakehner stock. These were used to increase the size and power of the breed and to make it more consistent in type. It became a general-purpose riding and sport horse.

A stud-book was begun in 1874.

Characteristics 

The coat may be of any solid colour.

Use 

It is a good general-purpose riding and sport horse. It performs well in dressage, show-jumping and three-day eventing, and also as a harness horse.

References 

Horse breeds
Horse breeds originating in Sweden
Warmbloods